Ibrahim Nooraddeen (Dhivehi: ސުލްޠާން އިބްރާހީމް ނުރައްދީން; died 1892) was twice the sultan of the Maldives. His first reign was from 1882 through 1886. After 4 years, 11 months and 29 days, Muhammad Mueenuddeen II took over the throne. Nooraddeen then came to power for the second time in 1888, and was the sultan until he died in 1892.

C.W. Rosset, who visited Maldives in 1885 during Sultan Ibrahim Nooraddeen's reign, wrote that he was informed by the British in Ceylon that the Sultan neither could read nor write. However historians claim that bodduns (advisors of the king) often presented an imposter depending on the meeting to foreigners. The bodduns often exercised control over the king.

References

1892 deaths
19th-century sultans of the Maldives
Year of birth unknown
Monarchs who abdicated